Charles Ellet Lippincott (January 25, 1825 – September 13, 1887) was an American physician and politician.

Born in Edwardsville, Illinois, Lippincott studied at Illinois College in Jacksonville, Illinois. He then received his medical degree from St. Louis Medical College, in Saint Louis, Missouri. He then practiced medicine in Chandlerville, Illinois. From 1852 to 1857, Lippincott lived in Yuba County, California. He served in the California State Senate from 1853 to 1855 and was a Democrat. Lippincott was involved with the anti-slavery movement in California. He returned to Chandlerville, Illinois and continue to practice medicine. During the American Civil War, Lippincott served in the 33rd Illinois Volunteer Infantry Regiment and was commissioned a colonel. In 1867, Lippincott served as secretary of the Illinois State Senate; then, he was appointed Doorkeeper of the United States House of Representatives. From 1869 to 1877, Lippincott served as Auditor of Public Accounts, State of Illinois. Lippincott was involved in the Republican Party in Illinois. He served as the first superintendent of the Soldiers and Sailors House in Quincy, Illinois; he died there in September 1887. While living in California and serving in the California State Senate, Lippincott was involved in a duel with Robert Tevis who was killed as the result of the duel.

Notes

External links

1825 births
1887 deaths
People from Edwardsville, Illinois
People from Cass County, Illinois
People from Quincy, Illinois
People from Yuba County, California
People of Illinois in the American Civil War
Union Army colonels
Illinois College alumni
Washington University School of Medicine alumni
Physicians from Illinois
California Democrats
Illinois Republicans
California state senators
Auditors of Public Accounts of Illinois
Employees of the United States House of Representatives
American duellists
19th-century American politicians